This is a list of Fourier analysis topics. See also the list of Fourier-related transforms, and the list of harmonic analysis topics.

Fourier analysis

 Multiplier (Fourier analysis)
 Fourier shell correlation
 Pinsky phenomenon

Fourier series

 Generalized Fourier series
 Regressive discrete Fourier series
 Gibbs phenomenon
 Sigma approximation
 Dini test
 Poisson summation formula
 Spectrum continuation analysis
 Convergence of Fourier series

Fourier transforms

 List of Fourier-related transforms
 Fourier transform on finite groups
 Fractional Fourier transform
 Continuous Fourier transform
 Fourier operator
 Fourier inversion theorem
 Sine and cosine transforms
 Parseval's theorem
 Paley–Wiener theorem
 Projection-slice theorem
 Frequency spectrum

Discrete Fourier transforms

 Discrete Fourier series
 Non-uniform discrete Fourier transform
 DFT matrix
 Entropy influence conjecture
 Fast cosine transform
 Fast Fourier transform
 Cyclotomic fast Fourier transform
 Sparse Fourier transform

Applications of Fourier analysis

 Fourier amplitude sensitivity testing
 Fourier optics
 Quantum mechanics, for 
Wavefunctions
Uncertainty principle
Quantum Fourier transform

Algebra and analysis

 Periodic function
 Almost periodic function
 ATS theorem
 Modulus of continuity
 Banach algebra
 Compact group
 Haar measure
 Hardy space
 Sobolev space
 Topological group

Harmonic analysis

 Set of uniqueness
 Pontryagin duality
 Plancherel theorem
 Peter–Weyl theorem
 Fourier integral operator
 Oscillatory integral operator

Harmonic functions

 Laplace operator
 Laplace equation
 Dirichlet problem
 Unit circle
 Unit disc
 Spherical harmonic

Special functions and generalized functions

 Bessel function
 Dirac delta function
 Distribution
 Oscillatory integral

Integral transform concepts

Transforms

 Laplace transform
 Discrete Hartley transform
 List of transforms

Integral kernels

 Dirichlet kernel
 Fejér kernel

Convolution

 Convolution theorem

Analysis of unevenly spaced data

 Least-squares spectral analysis

Other topics

 List of cycles
 LTI system theory
 Autocorrelation
 Autocovariance
 Whittaker–Shannon interpolation formula
 Gabor atom
 Marcinkiewicz theorem
 Nyquist–Shannon sampling theorem
 Riesz–Thorin theorem

Fourier analysis
 
Fourier analysis
Fourier analysis